Hutchison 3G UK Ltd (Three UK) is a British telecommunications and internet service provider currently based in Reading, England. It is a subsidiary of CK Hutchison Holdings, operating under the global Three brand. Three is the fourth-largest mobile network operator in the United Kingdom, with about 9.5 million subscribers as of 2021.

The company launched on 3 March 2003 as the United Kingdom's first commercial 100% 3G network. It provides 3G, 4G and 5G (certain areas) services through its own network infrastructure.

History
The Three mobile service was launched in the UK on 3 March 2003 with handsets going on sale (such as the NEC e616 in 2004 and Sony Ericsson Z1010) later that year. Three was the UK's first commercial video mobile (3G) network.

Three was the first network to meet its regulatory requirement of 80% population coverage in the UK, meeting this by 9 December 2004.

Three's first retail stores (3Store) opened at the same time as the network launched, on Oxford Street and Kensington High Street, both in London, and at the Birmingham Mailbox. Three also sold handsets, devices and contracts through independent and online retailers at the time. In 2005, Three expanded, and stores opened in larger shopping centres throughout the UK On 24 October 2006, Three announced that it had purchased 95 high street shops from O2 and The Link.

Three launched SeeMeTV, allowing its customers to submit their own video content that other subscribers could watch. Users would make a small micropayment (the price decided by the video's creator) to watch these videos. The user who created the videos would get paid 10% of the amount of money paid by other users to watch the video. Users were paid once they had accrued £10.

In 2010, Three became the fourth network in the UK to launch the iPhone 4 after O2, Orange and Vodafone.

In July 2014, Three introduced the '3 inTouch' app, allowing customers to place calls through a Wi-Fi connection. Three customers can also access the Virgin Wi-Fi network implemented at over 130 London Underground stations.

On 24 March 2015, Three's parent company Hutchison Whampoa announced it would acquire the UK operations of O2 for £10.25 billion, subject to regulatory approval. On 11 May 2016, EU commission blocked the purchase of O2 on the grounds that it would affect competition in the UK market.

In November 2016, three men were arrested after a data breach at the Three mobile network allowed fraudsters to access personal data and steal phones. The company said that while names and addresses were accessed, some financial information might be compromised. Fraudsters were understood to have used authorised login information to order upgraded phones, including iPhone and Samsung handsets, to be sent to customers before intercepting them. Three, which has nine million customers, said it believed around 400 phones had been stolen.
In early 2020, CEO of Three UK, Dave Dyson, resigned after 9 years at the helm. He was replaced by Three Ireland's CEO, Robert Finnegan, who now manages both companies.

Three had been the main shirt sponsor of Premier League club Chelsea since the 2020–21 season. On 10 March 2022, Three announced they were ending their sponsorship deal with Chelsea immediately, and asked the club to remove the 3 logo from their kits.

Network
In order to provide coverage parity with other networks in the UK, Three initially maintained a national roaming agreement with an established 2G network operator. Until 2006, O2 operated this service for Three customers. However, Orange was selected as the new national roaming partner from 10 May 2006.

In the early period of 3G network, Orange 2G (acquired by EE in 2010)  was adopted in areas as a fallback where 3G wasn't available. The 2G fallback coverage provided by Orange has since been removed as Three believes 3G and 4G technology is now sufficient for mass adoption - and as a result, older phones that support only 2G networks are not compatible with the Three network. From 2013, Three no longer provided a significant 2G fallback for most of the United Kingdom.

On 18 December 2007, T-Mobile and Three launched a 50:50 joint venture called Mobile Broadband Network Limited (MBNL) which aimed to combine both of their 3G networks and provide almost complete 3G population coverage by the end of 2008. On 12 November 2010, MBNL announced that the network had reached a total of 12,000 combined sites.

4G

Three began a limited rollout of 4G LTE services in December 2013 in London, Birmingham, Manchester and Reading expanding to over a further 450 locations by the end of 2014. In August 2012 Three was given permission to use part of the 1,800 MHz spectrum used by EE's 4G network. On 20 February 2013 Ofcom announced that Three had been awarded 2 x 5 MHz (10 MHz) of 800 MHz to use for 4G. Three planned to launch 4G in the second quarter of 2013, however it delayed the rollout until Q4, saying that it wanted to analyse the performance of other networks' 4G coverage first. The network provides LTE and DC-HSDPA service as a standard feature to all its subscribers using "Ultrafast" to describe both technologies, making it the cheapest price for 4G and the only unlimited 4G in the UK. On 23 April 2015, Three announced that VoLTE would be rolled out along with 800 MHz spectrum from September.

Roaming at domestic prices

Until 2009, Three subscribers in the UK, Ireland, Austria, Italy, Denmark, Sweden, Hong Kong and Australia could use their service on Three networks around the world for no extra charge with "3 Like Home". The service was relaunched on 30 August 2013 as "Feel At Home" for UK customers visiting Australia, Austria, Denmark, Hong Kong, Ireland, Italy and Sweden where calls, texts and data can be consumed without roaming charges; meaning they cost the same as for communication within the UK. Additional countries were subsequently added to "Feel At Home" including Finland, France, Indonesia, Israel, Macau, New Zealand, Norway, Spain, Sri Lanka, Switzerland and the United States. The service was expanded to a further 24 European countries in September 2016. Three changed the name of its roaming proposition from "Feel at Home" to "Go Roam", which now covers 59 countries and territories since 2017. Three advertises that the service covers "71 destinations" because it counts several countries multiple times. For example, Three counts "Ireland" and "Republic of Ireland" as two destinations, counts Åland in addition to Finland, counts two parts of Spain in addition to Spain, counts two parts of Portugal in addition to Portugal, and counts eight parts of France in addition to France. "Go Roam" only covers roaming, and does not include non-roaming services such as international calls made from the UK. Despite promising to keep EU Roaming free of charge, Three UK changed their terms and conditions in September 2021. Customers acquiring new contracts or updates after that date will no longer have "Go Roam" free of charge. This benefit is now subject to a £2 per day for roaming in EU countries (except Ireland) and £5 per day when roaming outside the EU.

Frequency allocations

Virtual operators 
The Three network is used by two mobile virtual network operators (MVNOs). Dixons Carphone launched their iD Mobile network in May 2015. In June 2018, Three UK and sister company Superdrug entered an MVNO partnership to launch Superdrug Mobile, which is exclusive to members of Superdrug's "Health & Beautycard" loyalty scheme.

SMARTY 
In August 2017, Three launched a no frills SIM-only brand called SMARTY to compete against O2's giffgaff and Vodafone's VOXI.

Awards 
In 2010, Three was voted Best Network for Mobile Broadband in a YouGov survey for the second year in a row.

References

External links
 

UK
British subsidiaries of foreign companies
Telecommunications companies established in 2003
Mobile phone companies of the United Kingdom
British companies established in 2003